Dahimi-ye Yek (also Romanized as Daḩīmī-ye Yek; also known as Daḩīmī) is a village in Howmeh-ye Gharbi Rural District, in the Central District of Dasht-e Azadegan County, Khuzestan Province, Iran. At the 2006 census, its population was 28, in 4 families.

References 

Populated places in Dasht-e Azadegan County